The Gasconade River is about  long and is located in central and south-central Missouri.

The Gasconade River begins in the Ozarks southeast of Hartville in Wright County and flows generally north-northeastwardly through Wright, Laclede, Pulaski, Phelps, Maries, Osage and Gasconade counties, through portions of the Mark Twain National Forest.  It flows into the Missouri River near the town of Gasconade in Gasconade County. At Rich Fountain, the river has a mean annual discharge of 3,097 cubic feet per second.

Name
The name Gasconade is derived from "Gascon", an inhabitant of the French region of Gascony.  The people of that province were noted for their boastfulness. It was applied by the early French to the Indians living on its banks who bragged about their exploits. The name means to boast or brag, and thus the river received its name. The waters of the river are boisterous and boastful and the name is also descriptive.

River course
The river follows a meandering course through the Ordovician age dolomite and sandstone bedrock of the Ozark Salem Plateau creating spectacular bluffs and incised meanders along the way. Numerous springs and caves occur within the drainage area and along the river course. Significant tributaries include the Osage Fork of Webster and Laclede counties and  Roubidoux Creek and Big Piney River of Texas and Pulaski counties. The Roubidoux and Big Piney flow respectively along the west and east boundaries of Fort Leonard Wood which lies a short distance south and east of the Gasconade.

At the junction with the Missouri the river bottom is about  lower in elevation than the old plateau surface above the river.

The Gasconade River is the longest river completely within the boundary of Missouri.  It has been called one of the world's crookedest rivers.

Recreational use
It is ranked with a difficulty of I and II (seldom) by those who canoe, kayak and float.  It is considered a good float stream because there's typically not a heavy congestion of boats.  It is common to go for many miles without seeing another boat.

There are caves and an abundance of wildlife along the river and is considered a popular place by anglers for its largemouth bass and smallmouth bass.

See also
Gasconade Bridge train disaster
List of Missouri rivers

Notes

Sources
Columbia Gazetteer of North America entry
DeLorme (2002).  Missouri Atlas & Gazetteer.  Yarmouth, Maine: DeLorme.  .

Missouri Canoe - an electronic reprint of a Missouri Department of Conservation document
Southwest Paddler
Canoe Missouri

Rivers of Missouri
Rivers of Gasconade County, Missouri
Rivers of Laclede County, Missouri
Rivers of Maries County, Missouri
Rivers of Osage County, Missouri
Rivers of Phelps County, Missouri
Rivers of Pulaski County, Missouri
Rivers of Wright County, Missouri
Bodies of water of the Ozarks
Tributaries of the Missouri River